Leo Hunger (June 20, 1880 – April 26, 1956) was an American gymnast. He competed in four events at the 1904 Summer Olympics.

References

External links
 

1880 births
1956 deaths
American male artistic gymnasts
Olympic gymnasts of the United States
Gymnasts at the 1904 Summer Olympics
Sportspeople from Minneapolis